Luka Lučić (born 2 January 1995) is a Croatian professional footballer who plays as a left-back for Bosnian Premier League club Posušje.

Club career
Lučić is a youth product of Hajduk Split. He made his professional debut in the Prva HNL on 26 May 2013 against Dinamo Zagreb, playing as a left-back. He remained in the U19 team, making only two appearances for the first team in the 2013–14 season despite playing for the Croatia U19 national team, and playing for the B team in the first part of the 2014–15 season.

In January 2015, Lučić joined Czech First League team Baník Ostrava, signing a professional contract until 30 June 2018.

Honours
Hajduk Split
Croatian Cup: 2012–13

Zrinjski Mostar
Bosnian Premier League: 2016–17

References

External links

Luka Lučić at hajduk.hr

1995 births
Living people
Footballers from Split, Croatia
Association football defenders
Croatian footballers
HNK Hajduk Split players
HNK Hajduk Split II players
FC Baník Ostrava players
HŠK Zrinjski Mostar players
FK Borac Banja Luka players
HŠK Posušje players
FK Tuzla City players
Croatian Football League players
Czech First League players
Premier League of Bosnia and Herzegovina players
First League of the Federation of Bosnia and Herzegovina players
Croatian expatriate footballers
Croatian expatriate sportspeople in the Czech Republic
Expatriate footballers in the Czech Republic
Croatian expatriate sportspeople in Bosnia and Herzegovina
Expatriate footballers in Bosnia and Herzegovina